Dunoding was an early sub-kingdom within the Kingdom of Gwynedd in north-west Wales that existed between the 5th and 10th centuries.  According to tradition, it was named after Dunod, a son of the founding father of Gwynedd - Cunedda Wledig - who drove the Irish settlers from the area in c.460.  The territory existed as a subordinate realm within Gwynedd until the line of rulers descended from Dunod expired in c.925.  Following the end of the House of Dunod, it was split into the cantrefi of Eifionydd and Ardudwy and fully incorporated into Gwynedd.  After the defeat of the kingdom of Gwynedd in 1283 and its annexation to England, the two cantrefi became parts of the counties of Caernarfonshire and Meirionnydd respectively.  It is now part of the modern county of Gwynedd within a devolved Wales.

List of the rulers of Dunoding
Later medieval genealogical sources, which need treating with some caution, list the following rulers of Dunoding:

Dunod ap Cunedda (from c.450)
Eifion ap Dunod
Dingad ab Eifion
Meurig ap Dingad
Eifion ap Meurig
Isaac ab Eifion
Pobien Hen ab Isaac
Pobddelw ap Pobien
Eifion ap Pobddelw
Brochwel ab Eifion
Eigion ap Brochwel
Ieuanawl ab Eigion
Caradog ab Ieuanawl
Bleiddud ap Caradog
Cuhelyn ap Bleiddud (c.860 - 925)

Cantrefs
Medieval Wales
Kingdoms of Wales